Rodrigo Fernandes da Conceição (born 2 January 2000) is a Portuguese professional footballer who plays as a winger or right-back for Porto.

Club career

Benfica
Born in Porto, Conceição passed through several youth teams before joining Benfica in 2015, aged 15. On 3 November 2018, he made his professional debut with the reserves in a 2018–19 LigaPro match away to Paços de Ferreira, as a substitute for the last 15 minutes of a 1–0 loss in place of Florentino Luís.

Conceição scored his first senior goal on 3 November 2019, opening a 3–1 home loss to Chaves.

Porto
On 27 August 2020, having left Benfica, Conceição signed a three-year deal for Porto, being again assigned to the reserve team. He played 30 times in his first season, scoring to conclude a 4–0 win at Mafra on 29 March 2021 after assisting two other goals. On 22 May, in the last game of the campaign, he was sent off in a 2–1 loss at his previous team and suspended for two games.

Conceição was loaned to Primeira Liga club Moreirense for the season on 22 July 2021. He made his top-flight debut on 15 August in a 2–2 draw at Santa Clara, in which he came on in the 73rd minute for Rúben Ramos and received a red card three minutes later for telling the fourth official to open his eyes; he was banned for a game and fined €842, while maintaining that he was victimised for being from the Conceição family.

International career
Conceição earned 34 caps for Portugal at youth level, scoring five goals. His first appearance was on 4 February 2016 in the under-16 team's 3–3 draw with Germany in Vila Real de Santo António; he scored the equaliser and his team won on penalties. On 3 April, he scored both goals of a win against Switzerland in Póvoa de Varzim as his team finished a local tournament with a  100% record. On 7 September 2018, he was sent off in the under-19 team's 1–0 friendly win away to Italy. He made his debut for the under-21 side in a 9–0 win against Liechtenstein in Vaduz on 7 June 2022.

Personal life
Conceição is the second of five sons born to Portuguese international footballer Sérgio Conceição. All of the first four embarked on football careers, including one also named Sérgio and Francisco.

See also
List of association football families

References

External links
Profile at the FC Porto website

2000 births
Living people
Footballers from Porto
Portuguese footballers
Portugal youth international footballers
Association football forwards
C.F. Os Belenenses players
Imortal D.C. players
S.C. Olhanense players
Boavista F.C. players
S.L. Benfica B players
FC Porto B players
Moreirense F.C. players
Primeira Liga players
Liga Portugal 2 players